Moo Free Ltd. is a British manufacturer of dairy free, gluten free, vegan and organic chocolates. Their head office is located in Holswothy, Devon. The company was established in 2010 by husband and wife team Mike and Andrea Jessop with the intent of making a dairy free chocolate with a taste similar to that of milk chocolate by using rice milk instead of conventional dairy milk. The concept was to ensure that vegan children or those with food allergies or intolerance could have traditional seasonal chocolates such as Easter eggs and Advent calendars. In addition to being vegan, the company's products are also free from dairy, gluten, wheat and soya, and are made from organically certified ingredients.

The company's range includes a variety of bars, bags of chocolates and seasonal products including Advent Calendars and Easter Eggs.

Awards

Product Awards 
The company's products have received a number of awards and commendations, including 'Best Sweets or Cakes' and 'Best Vegan Chocolates' in the Vegfest Awards 2011, 2012, 2013, 2014, 2016 and 2018 and the FreeFrom Food Awards Ireland 2016 - 'Best Free From Chocolate'.

Business Awards 

Moo Free have received several business awards over the years including the Food & Drink Federation's (FDF) - 'Growth Business Award'  and The Queen's Award For Enterprise: International Trade 2016.

References

External links 
Official site

British chocolate companies
Food and drink companies established in 2010
2010 establishments in England
British companies established in 2010
Organic chocolate
Vegan cuisine
Veganism in the United Kingdom